Sir Henri Charles Wilfrid Laurier,  (November 20, 1841 – February 17, 1919) was a Canadian lawyer, statesman, and politician who served as the seventh prime minister of Canada from 1896 to 1911. The first French Canadian prime minister, his 15-year tenure remains the longest unbroken term of office among Canadian prime ministers and his nearly 45 years of service in the House of Commons is a record for the House. Laurier is best known for his compromises between English and French Canada.

Laurier studied law at McGill University and practised as a lawyer before being elected to the Legislative Assembly of Quebec in 1871. He was then elected as a member of Parliament (MP) in the 1874 federal election. As an MP, Laurier gained a large personal following among French Canadians and the Québécois. He also came to be known as a great orator. After serving as minister of inland revenue under Prime Minister Alexander Mackenzie from 1877 to 1878, Laurier became leader of the Liberal Party in 1887, thus becoming leader of the Official Opposition. He lost the 1891 federal election to Prime Minister John A. Macdonald's Conservatives. However, controversy surrounding the Conservative government's handling of the Manitoba Schools Question, which was triggered by the Manitoba government's elimination of funding for Catholic schools, gave Laurier a victory in the 1896 federal election. He paved the Liberal Party to three more election victories afterwards.

As prime minister, Laurier solved the Manitoba Schools Question by allowing Catholic students to have a Catholic education on a school-by-school basis. Despite his controversial handling of the dispute and criticism from some French Canadians who believed that the resolution was insufficient, he was nicknamed "the Great Conciliator" for offering a compromise between French and English Canada. Two issues, the United Kingdom demanding Canadian military support to fight in the Second Boer War, and the United Kingdom asking Canada to send money for the British Navy, divided the country as English Canadians supported Britain's requests whereas French Canadians did not. Laurier's government sought a middle ground between the two groups, deciding to send a volunteer force to fight in the Boer War and passing the 1910 Naval Service Act to create Canada's own navy. In addition, his government dramatically increased immigration, oversaw Alberta and Saskatchewan's entry into Confederation, constructed the Grand Trunk Pacific and National Transcontinental Railways, and put effort into establishing Canada as an autonomous country within the British Empire.

Laurier's proposed reciprocity agreement with the United States to lower tariffs became a main issue in the 1911 federal election, in which the Liberals were defeated by the Conservatives led by Robert Borden, who claimed that the treaty would lead to the US influencing Canadian identity. Despite his defeat, Laurier stayed on as Liberal leader and once again became leader of the Opposition. During World War I and the Conscription Crisis of 1917, Laurier faced divisions within the Liberal Party as pro-conscription Liberals joined Borden's Unionist government. The anti-conscription faction of the Liberal Party, led by Laurier, became the Laurier Liberals, though the group would be heavily defeated by Borden's Unionists in the 1917 federal election. Laurier remained Opposition leader even after his 1917 defeat, but was not able to fight in another election as he died in 1919. Laurier is ranked among the top three of Canadian prime ministers. At 31 years and 8 months, Laurier is the longest-serving leader of a major Canadian political party. He is the fourth-longest serving prime minister of Canada, behind Pierre Trudeau, Macdonald, and William Lyon Mackenzie King.

Early life (1841–1871)

Childhood 
The second child of Carolus Laurier and Marcelle Martineau, Henri Charles Wilfrid Laurier was born in Saint-Lin, Canada East (modern-day Saint-Lin-Laurentides, Quebec), on November 20, 1841. He was a sixth-generation French Canadian. His ancestor François Cottineau, dit Champlaurier, came to Canada from Saint-Claud, France. Laurier grew up in a family where politics was a staple of talk and debate. His father, an educated man having liberal ideas, enjoyed a certain degree of prestige about town. In addition to being a farmer and surveyor, he also occupied such sought-after positions as mayor, justice of the peace, militia lieutenant and school board member. At the age of 11, Wilfrid left home to study in New Glasgow, Quebec, a neighbouring village largely inhabited by immigrants from Scotland. Over the next two years, he familiarized himself with the mentality, language and culture of British people, in addition to learning English. In 1854, Laurier attended the Collège de L'Assomption, an institution that staunchly followed Roman Catholicism. There, he started to develop an interest in politics, and began to endorse the ideology of liberalism, despite the school being heavily conservative.

Political beginnings 

In September 1861, Laurier began studying law at McGill University. There, he met Zoé Lafontaine, who would later become his wife. Laurier also discovered that he had chronic bronchitis, an illness that would stick with him for the rest of his life. At McGill, Laurier joined the Parti Rouge, or Red Party, which was a centre-left political party that contested elections in Canada East. In 1864, Laurier graduated from McGill. Laurier would continue being active within the Parti Rouge, and from May 1864 to fall 1866, served as vice president of the Institut canadien de Montréal, a literary society with ties to the Rouge. In August 1864, Laurier joined the Liberals of Lower Canada, an anti-Confederation group composed of both moderates and radicals. The group argued that Confederation would give too much power to the central, or federal government, and the group believed that Confederation would lead to discrimination towards French Canadians.

Laurier then practised law in Montreal, though he initially struggled as a lawyer. He opened his first practice on October 27, 1864, but closed it within a month. He established his second office, but that closed within three months, due to a lack of clients. In March 1865, nearly bankrupt, Laurier established his third law firm, partnering with Médéric Lanctot, a lawyer and journalist who staunchly opposed Confederation. The two experienced some success, but in late 1866, Laurier was invited by fellow Rouge Antoine-Aimé Dorion to replace his recently deceased brother to became editor and run the newspaper, Le Défricheur.

Laurier moved to Victoriaville and began writing and controlling the newspaper from January 1, 1867. Laurier saw this as an opportunity to express his strong anti-Confederation views; in one instance he wrote, "Confederation is the second stage on the road to ‘anglification’ mapped out by Lord Durham...We are being handed over to the English majority...[We must] use whatever influence we have left to demand and obtain a free and separate government." On March 21, Le Défricheur was forced to shut down, as a result of financial issues and opposition from the local clergy. On July 1, Confederation was officially proclaimed and recognized, a defeat for Laurier.

Laurier decided to remain in Victoriaville. He slowly became well known across the town with a population of 730, and was even elected mayor not so long after he settled. In addition, he established a law practice which would span for three decades and have four different partners. He would make some money, but not enough to consider himself wealthy. During his period in Victoriaville, Laurier opted to accept Confederation and identify himself as a moderate liberal, as opposed to a radical liberal.

Early political career (1871–1887)

Member of the Legislative Assembly of Quebec (1871–1874)

A member of the Quebec Liberal Party, Laurier was elected to the Legislative Assembly of Quebec for the riding of Drummond-Arthabaska in the 1871 Quebec general election, though the Liberal Party altogether suffered a landslide defeat. To win the provincial riding, Laurier campaigned on increasing funding for education, agriculture, and colonization. His career as a provincial politician was not noteworthy, and very few times would he make speeches in the legislature.

Member of Parliament (1874–1887)

Laurier resigned from the provincial legislature to enter federal politics as a Liberal. He was elected to the House of Commons in the January 22, 1874 election, representing the riding of Drummond—Arthabaska. In this election, the Liberals led by Alexander Mackenzie heavily triumphed, as a result of the Pacific Scandal that was initiated by the Conservative Party and the Conservative prime minister, John A. Macdonald. Laurier ran a simple campaign, denouncing Conservative corruption.

As a member of Parliament (MP), Laurier's first mission was to build prominence by giving speeches in the House of Commons. He gained considerable attention when he delivered a speech on political liberalism on June 26, 1877, in front of about 2,000 people. He stated, "Liberal Catholicism is not political liberalism" and that the Liberal Party is not "a party composed of men holding perverse doctrines, with a dangerous tendency, and knowingly and deliberately progressing towards revolution." He also stated, "The policy of the Liberal party is to protect [our] institutions, to defend them and spread them, and, under the sway of those institutions, to develop the country’s latent resources. That is the policy of the Liberal party and it has no other." The speech helped Laurier become a leader of the Quebec wing of the Liberal Party.

From October 1877 to October 1878, Laurier served briefly in the Cabinet of Prime Minister Mackenzie as minister of inland revenue. However, his appointment triggered an October 27, 1877 ministerial by-election. In the by-election, he lost his seat in Drummond—Arthabaska. On November 11, he ran for the seat of Quebec East, which he narrowly won. From November 11, 1877, to his death on February 17, 1919, Laurier's seat would be Quebec East. Laurier won reelection for Quebec East in the 1878 federal election, though the Liberals suffered a landslide defeat as a result of their mishandling of the Panic of 1873. Macdonald returned as prime minister.

Laurier called on Mackenzie to resign as leader, not least because of his handling of the economy. Mackenzie resigned as Liberal leader in 1880 and was succeeded by Edward Blake. Laurier, along with others, founded the Quebec newspaper, L’Électeur, to promote the Liberal Party. The Liberals were in opposition once again, and Laurier made use of that status, expressing his support for laissez-faire economics and provincial rights. The Liberals suffered a second consecutive defeat in 1882, with Macdonald winning his fourth term. Laurier continued to make speeches opposing the Conservative government's policies, though nothing notable came until 1885, when he spoke out against the execution of Métis activist Louis Riel, who was hung by Macdonald's government authorities after leading the North-West Rebellion.

Leader of the Official Opposition (1887–1896)

Edward Blake resigned as Liberal leader after leading them to back-to-back defeats in 1882 and 1887. Blake urged Laurier to run for leadership of the party. At first, Laurier refused as he was not keen to take such a powerful position, but later on accepted. After 13 and a half years, Laurier had already established his reputation. He was now a prominent politician who was known for leading the Quebec branch of the Liberal Party, known for defending French Canadian rights, and known for being a great orator who was a fierce parliamentary speaker. Over the next nine years, Laurier gradually built up his party's strength through his personal following both in Quebec and elsewhere in Canada.

In the 1891 federal election, Laurier faced Conservative Prime Minister John A. Macdonald. Laurier campaigned in favour of reciprocity, or free trade, with the United States, contrary to Macdonald's position on the matter, who claimed that reciprocity would lead to American annexation of Canada. On election day, March 5, the Liberals gained 10 seats. The Liberals also won a majority of seats in Quebec for the first time since the 1874 election. Prime Minister Macdonald won his fourth consecutive federal election victory. The day after, Blake denounced the Liberal trade policy.

Laurier remained disillusioned for some time after his defeat. Multiple times he suggested he resign as leader, though he was persuaded not to by other Liberals. Only in 1893 did Laurier become encouraged again. On June 20 and 21, 1893, Laurier convened a Liberal convention in Ottawa. The convention established that unrestricted reciprocity was intended to develop Canada's natural resources and that keeping a customs tariff was intended to generate revenue. Laurier subsequently undertook a series of speaking tours to campaign on the convention's results. Laurier visited Western Canada in September and October 1894, promising to relax the Conservatives' National Policy, open the American market, and increase immigration.

Macdonald died only three months after he defeated Laurier in the 1891 election. After Macdonald's death, the Conservatives went through a period of disorganization with four short-serving leaders. The fourth prime minister after Macdonald, Charles Tupper, became prime minister in May 1896 after Mackenzie Bowell resigned as a result of a leadership crisis that was triggered by his attempts to offer a compromise for the Manitoba Schools Question, a dispute which emerged after the provincial government ended funding for Catholic schools in 1890. Tupper faced Laurier in the 1896 federal election, in which the schools dispute was a key issue. While Tupper supported overriding the provincial legislation to reinstate funding for the Catholic schools, Laurier was vague when giving his position on the matter, proposing an investigation of the issue first and then conciliation, a method he famously called, "sunny ways". On June 23, Laurier led the Liberals to their first victory in 22 years, despite losing the popular vote. Laurier's win was made possible by his sweep in Quebec.

Prime Minister (1896–1911)

Domestic policy

Manitoba Schools Question

One of Laurier's first acts as prime minister was to implement a solution to the Manitoba Schools Question, which had helped to bring down the Conservative government of Charles Tupper earlier in 1896. The Manitoba legislature had passed a law eliminating public funding for Catholic schooling. Supporters of Catholic schools argued that the new statute was contrary to the provisions of the Manitoba Act, 1870, which had a provision relating to school funding, but the courts rejected that argument and held that the new statute was constitutional. The Catholic minority in Manitoba then asked the federal government for support, and eventually, the Conservatives proposed remedial legislation to override Manitoba's legislation. Laurier opposed the remedial legislation on the basis of provincial rights and succeeded in blocking its passage by Parliament. Once elected, Laurier reached a compromise with the provincial premier, Thomas Greenway. Known as the Laurier-Greenway Compromise, the agreement did not allow separate Catholic schools to be re-established. However, religious instruction (Catholic education) would take place for 30 minutes at the end of each day, if requested by the parents of 10 children in rural areas or 25 in urban areas. Catholic teachers were allowed to be hired in the schools as long as there were at least 40 Catholic students in urban areas or 25 Catholic students in rural areas, and teachers could speak in French (or any other minority language) as long as there were enough Francophone students. This was seen by many as the best possible solution in the circumstances, however, some French Canadians criticized this move as it was done on an individual basis, and did not protect Catholic or French rights in all schools. Laurier called his effort to lessen the tinder in this issue "sunny ways".

Railway construction

Laurier's government introduced and initiated the idea of constructing a second transcontinental railway, the Grand Trunk Pacific Railway. The first transcontinental railway, the Canadian Pacific Railway, had limitations and was not able to meet everyone's needs. In the West, the railway was not able to transport everything produced by farmers and in the East, the railway did not reach into Northern Ontario and Northern Quebec. Laurier was in favour of a transcontinental line built entirely on Canadian land by private enterprise.

Laurier's government also constructed a third railway: the National Transcontinental Railway. It was made to provide Western Canada with direct rail connection to the Atlantic ports and to open up and develop Northern Ontario and Northern Quebec. Laurier believed that competition between the three railways would force one of the three, the Canadian Pacific Railway, to lower freight rates and thus please Western shippers who would contribute to the competition between the railways. Laurier initially reached out to Grand Trunk Railway and Canadian Northern Railway to build the National Transcontinental railway, but after disagreements emerged between the two companies, Laurier's government opted to build part of the railway itself. However, Laurier's government soon struck a deal with the Grand Trunk Pacific Railway Company (subsidiary of the Grand Trunk Railway Company) to build the western section (from Winnipeg to the Pacific Ocean) while the government would build the eastern section (from Winnipeg to Moncton). Once completed, Laurier's government would hand over the railway to the company for operation. Laurier's government gained criticism from the public due to the heavy cost to construct the railway.

Provincial and territorial boundaries

On September 1, 1905, through the Alberta Act and the Saskatchewan Act, Laurier oversaw Alberta and Saskatchewan's entry into Confederation, the last two provinces to be created out of the Northwest Territories. Laurier decided to create two provinces, arguing that one large province would be too difficult to govern. This followed the enactment of the Yukon Territory Act by the Laurier Government in 1898, separating the Yukon from the Northwest Territories. Also in 1898, Quebec was enlarged through the Quebec Boundary Extension Act.

Immigration

Laurier's government dramatically increased immigration to grow the economy. Between 1897 and 1914, at least a million immigrants arrived in Canada, and Canada's population increased by 40 percent. Laurier's immigration policy targeted the Prairies as he argued that it would increase farming production and benefit the agriculture industry.

The British Columbia electorate was alarmed at the arrival of people they considered "uncivilized" by Canadian standards, and adopted a whites-only policy. Although railways and large companies wanted to hire Asians, labour unions and the public at large stood opposed.  Both major parties went along with public opinion, with Laurier taking the lead. Scholars have argued that Laurier acted in terms of his racist views in restricting immigration from China and India, as shown by his support for the Chinese head tax. In 1900, Laurier raised the Chinese head tax to $100.  In 1903, this was further raised to $500, but when a few Chinese did pay the $500, he proposed raising the sum to $1,000. This was not the first time Laurier showed racially charged action, and over the course of his time as a politician, he had a history of racist views and actions. In 1886, Laurier told the House of Commons that it was moral for Canada to take lands from “savage nations” so long as the government paid adequate compensation. Laurier also negotiated a limit to Japanese emigration to Canada.

In August 1911, Laurier approved the Order-in-Council P.C. 1911-1324 recommended by the minister of the interior, Frank Oliver. The order was approved by the cabinet on August 12, 1911. The order was intended to keep out Black Americans escaping segregation in the American south, stating that "the Negro race...is deemed unsuitable to the climate and requirements of Canada." The order was never called upon, as efforts by immigration officials had already reduced the number of Blacks migrating to Canada. The order was cancelled on October 5, 1911, the day before Laurier left office, by cabinet claiming that the minister of the interior was not present at the time of approval.

Social policy 

In March 1906, Laurier's government introduced the Lord's Day Act after being persuaded by the Lord's Day Alliance. The Act became effective on March 1, 1907. It prohibited business transactions from taking place on Sundays; it also restricted Sunday trade, labour, recreation, and newspapers. The Act was supported by organized labour and the French Canadian Catholic hierarchy but was opposed by those who worked in the manufacturing and transportation sectors. It was also opposed by French Canadians due to them believing the federal government was interfering in a provincial matter; the Quebec government passed its own Lord’s Day Act that came into effect one day before the federal act did.

In 1907, Laurier's government passed the Industrial Disputes Investigation Act, which mandated conciliation for employers and workers before any strike in public utilities or mines, but did not make it necessary for the groups to accept the conciliators’ report. 

In 1908 a system was introduced where by annuities may be purchased from the government, the aim of which was to encourage voluntary provision for old age.

Foreign policy

United Kingdom

On June 22, 1897, Laurier attended the Diamond Jubilee of Queen Victoria, which was the 60th anniversary of her coronation. There, he was knighted, and was given several honours, honorary degrees, and medals. Laurier again visited the United Kingdom in 1902, taking part in the 1902 Colonial Conference and the coronation of King Edward VII on 9 August 1902. Laurier also took part in the 1907 and 1911 Imperial Conferences.

In 1899, the United Kingdom expected military support from Canada, as part of the British Empire, in the Second Boer War. Laurier was caught between demands for support for military action from English Canada and a strong opposition from French Canada, which saw the Boer War as an English war. Laurier eventually decided to send a volunteer force, rather than the militia expected by Britain. Roughly 7,000 Canadian soldiers participated in the volunteer force. Outspoken French Canadian nationalist and Liberal MP Henri Bourassa was an especially vocal opponent of any form of military participation and thus resigned from the Liberal caucus in October 1899.

On June 1, 1909, Laurier's government established the Department of External Affairs for Canada to take greater control of its foreign policy.

The naval competition between the United Kingdom and the German Empire escalated in the early years of the 20th century. The British asked Canada for more money and resources for ship construction, precipitating a heated political division in Canada. Many English Canadians wished to send as much as possible; many French Canadians and those against wished to send nothing. Aiming for compromise, Laurier advanced the Naval Service Act of 1910 which created the Royal Canadian Navy. The navy would initially consist of five cruisers and six destroyers; in times of crisis, it could be made subordinate to the British Royal Navy. However, the idea faced opposition in both English and French Canada, especially in Quebec as ex-Liberal and staunch French Canadian nationalist Henri Bourassa organized an anti-Laurier force.

Alaska boundary dispute

In 1897 and 1898, the Alaska-Canada border emerged as a pressing issue. The Klondike Gold Rush prompted Laurier to demand an all-Canadian route from the gold fields to a seaport. The region being a desirable place with lots of gold furthered Laurier's ambition of fixing an exact boundary. Laurier also wanted to establish who owned the Lynn Canal and who controlled maritime access to the Yukon. Laurier and US President William McKinley agreed to set up a joint Anglo-American commission that would study the differences and resolve the dispute. However, this commission was unsuccessful and came to an abrupt end on February 20, 1899.

The dispute was then referred to an international judicial commission in 1903, which included three American politicians (Elihu Root, Henry Cabot Lodge, and George Turner), two Canadians (Allen Bristol Aylesworth and Louis-Amable Jetté) and one Briton (Lord Alverstone, Lord Chief Justice of England). On October 20, 1903, the commission by a majority (Root, Lodge, Turner, and Alverstone) ruled to support the American government's claims. Canada only acquired two islands below the Portland Canal. The decision provoked a wave of anti-American and anti-British sentiment in Canada, which Laurier temporarily encouraged.

Tariffs and trade

Though supportive of free trade with the United States, Laurier did not pursue the idea because the American government refused to discuss the issue. Instead, he implemented a Liberal version of the Conservatives' nationalist and protectionist National Policy by maintaining high tariffs on goods from other countries that restricted Canadian goods. However, he lowered tariffs to the same level as countries that admitted Canadian goods.

In 1897, Laurier's government impelemented a preferential reduction of a tariff rate of 12.5 percent for countries that imported Canadian goods at a rate equivalent to the minimum Canadian charge; rates for countries that imposed a protective duty against Canada remained the same. For the most part, the policy was supported by those for free trade (due to the preferential reduction) and those against free trade (due to elements of the National Policy remaining in place).

Laurier's government again reformed tariffs in 1907. His government introduced a "three-column tariff", which added a new intermediate rate (a bargaining rate) alongside the existing British preferential rate and the general rate (which applied to all countries that Canada had no most-favoured-nation agreement with). The preferential and general rates remained unchanged, while the intermediate rates were slightly lower than the general rates.

Also in 1907, Laurier's minister of finance, William Stevens Fielding, and minister of marine and fisheries, Louis-Philippe Brodeur, negotiated a trade agreement with France which lowered import duties on some goods. In 1909, Fielding negotiated an agreement to promote trade with the British West Indies.

Election victories 
Laurier led the Liberals to three re-elections in 1900, 1904, and 1908. In the 1900 and 1904 elections, the Liberals' popular vote and seat share kept increasing whereas in the 1908 election, their popular vote and seat share went slightly down.

Quebec stronghold 
By the late 1900s, Laurier had been able to build the Liberal Party a base in Quebec, which had remained a Conservative stronghold for decades due to the province's social conservatism and to the influence of the Roman Catholic Church, which distrusted the Liberals' anti-clericalism. The growing alienation of French Canadians from the Conservative Party due to its links with anti-French, anti-Catholic Orangemen in English Canada aided the Liberal Party. These factors, combined with the collapse of the Conservative Party of Quebec, gave Laurier an opportunity to build a stronghold in French Canada and among Catholics across Canada. However, Catholic priests in Quebec repeatedly warned their parishioners not to vote for Liberals. Their slogan was "" ("heaven is blue, hell is red", referring to the Conservative and Liberal parties' traditional colours).

Reciprocity and defeat
In 1911, controversy arose regarding Laurier's support of trade reciprocity with the United States. His long-serving minister of finance, William Stevens Fielding, reached an agreement allowing for the free trade of natural products. The agreement would also lower tariffs. This had the strong support of agricultural interests, particularly in Western Canada, but it alienated many businessmen who formed a significant part of the Liberal base. The Conservatives denounced the deal and played on long-standing fears that reciprocity could eventually lead to weakened ties with Britain and a Canadian economy dominated by the United States. They also campaigned on fears that this would lead to the Canadian identity being taken away by the US and the American annexation of Canada.

Contending with an unruly House of Commons, including vocal disapproval from Liberal MP Clifford Sifton, Laurier called an election to settle the issue of reciprocity. The Conservatives were victorious and the Liberals lost over a third of their seats. The Conservatives' leader, Robert Laird Borden, succeeded Laurier as prime minister. Over 15 consecutive years of Liberal rule ended.

Opposition and war (1911–1919)

Laurier stayed on as Liberal leader. In December 1912, he started leading the filibuster and fight against the Conservatives' own naval bill which would have sent $35 million directly to the British Navy. Laurier argued that this threatened Canadian autonomy. After six months of battling the bill, the bill was blocked by the Liberal-controlled Senate.

Laurier led the opposition during World War I. He supported sending a volunteer force to fight in the war, arguing that an intense campaign for volunteers would produce enough troops. Borden initially had a volunteer military system in place, but when applications started to decline, he imposed conscription in the summer of 1917, which led to the Conscription Crisis of 1917. Laurier was an influential opponent of conscription, and his position on the matter was applauded by French Canadians, who were generally anti-conscription. Pro-conscription Liberals, particularly from English Canada, joined Borden as Liberal-Unionists to form the Union government. Laurier refused to join the Unionist Party, and instead created the "Laurier Liberals", a party composed of Liberals opposed to conscription. Laurier also rejected Prime Minister Borden's proposal to form a coalition government composed of both Conservatives and Liberals, arguing that there would be no "real" opposition to the government. He also argued that if the Liberals joined, Quebec would feel alienated and would lead to the province being heavily influenced by outspoken French-Canadian nationalist Henri Bourassa, and what Laurier called Bourassa's "dangerous nationalism" which might lead to Quebec seceding from Canada.

In the 1917 election, the Laurier Liberals were reduced to a mostly French Canadian rump. Laurier swept Quebec, winning 62 out of 65 of the province's seats, not least due to the French Canadians' overwhelming respect and support for Laurier as a result of his opposition to conscription.

The Conscription Crisis once again revealed the divisions between French Canadians and English Canadians. Most English Canadians favoured conscription as they believed this would strengthen ties with the British Empire, whereas most French Canadians opposed conscription as they wanted nothing to do with the war. Laurier was now seen as a "traitor" to English Canadians and English Canadian Liberals, whereas he was seen as a "hero" for French Canadians. Laurier's protégé and successor as party leader, William Lyon Mackenzie King, unified the English and French factions of the Liberal Party, leading it to victory over the Conservatives in the 1921 federal election.

After the election, Laurier still stayed on as Liberal and Opposition leader. When World War I came to an end on November 11, 1918, he focused on his efforts to rebuild and reunify the Liberal Party.

Death

Laurier died of a stroke on February 17, 1919, while still in office as leader of the Opposition. Though he had lost a bitter election two years earlier, he was loved nationwide for his "warm smile, his sense of style, and his "sunny ways"." 50,000 to 100,000 people jammed the streets of Ottawa as his funeral procession marched to his final resting place at Notre Dame Cemetery. His remains would eventually be placed in a stone sarcophagus, adorned by sculptures of nine mourning female figures, representing each of the provinces in the union. His wife, Zoé Laurier, died on November 1, 1921 and was placed in the same tomb.

Laurier was permanently succeeded as Liberal leader by his former minister of labour, William Lyon Mackenzie King. King narrowly defeated Laurier's former minister of finance, William Stevens Fielding. According to Zoé, Fielding was Laurier's choice for next leader; Laurier believed Fielding had the best chance to restore unity in the party.

Personal life

Wilfrid Laurier married Zoé Lafontaine in Montreal on May 13, 1868. She was the daughter of G.N.R. Lafontaine and his first wife, Zoé Tessier known as Zoé Lavigne. Laurier's wife Zoé was born in Montreal and educated there at the School of the Bon Pasteur, and at the Convent of the Sisters of the Sacred Heart, St. Vincent de Paul. The couple lived at Arthabaskaville until they moved to Ottawa in 1896. She served as one of the vice presidents on the formation of the National Council of Women and was honorary vice president of the Victorian Order of Nurses. The couple had no children.

Beginning in 1878 and for some twenty years while married to Zoé, Laurier had an "ambiguous relationship" with a married woman, Émilie Barthe. Zoé was not an intellectual; Émilie was, and relished literature and politics like Wilfrid, whose heart she won. Rumour had it he fathered a son, Armand Lavergne, with her, yet Zoé remained with him until his death.

Legacy

Overall, Laurier's efforts to remain neutral between English Canadians and French Canadians, and his efforts to seek a middle ground between the two ethnic groups have paved the way for him to be ranked among the top three of Canadian prime ministers. Despite being a French Canadian, he did not fully accept the French Canadian demands of repealing Manitoba's ban on public funding for Catholic schools nor did he fully accept their demands of refusing to send any Canadian troop to fight in the Boer War. Nonetheless, in all seven elections he fought, the majority of Quebec's ridings were handed over to his Liberal Party. Despite one notable exception in 1958, the Liberal Party continued to dominate federal politics in Quebec until 1984.

Historian Jacques Monet wrote, "To his faithful followers, especially in Quebec, where his surname is used as a first name by many other Canadians, Laurier is a charismatic hero whose term of office was a happy time in Canadian history. He worked all his life for cooperation between French- and English-speaking Canadians while he strove to keep Canada as independent as possible from Britain. His personal charm and dignity, his great skill as an orator, and his great gifts of intellect won the admiration of all Canadians and non-Canadians alike."

According to historians Norman Hillmer and Stephen Azzi, a 2011 poll of 117 historians and experts voted Laurier as the "best" Canadian prime minister, ahead of John A. Macdonald and Mackenzie King. Laurier was ranked Number 3 of the Prime Ministers of Canada (out of the 20 through Jean Chrétien) in the survey by Canadian historians included in Prime Ministers: Ranking Canada's Leaders by J.L. Granatstein and Norman Hillmer. "Passionate, charismatic, and an intellectual force in both languages," the Canadian War Museum's Tim Cook stated, "Sir Wilfrid was the full package."

Recognition

National historic sites

Laurier is commemorated by three National Historic Sites.

Its establishment reflected an early desire to not only mark his birthplace (a plaque in 1925 and a monument in 1927), but to create a shrine to Laurier in the 1930s. Despite early doubts and later confirmation that the house designated as the birthplace was neither Laurier's nor on its original site, its development, and the building of a museum, satisfied the goal of honoring the man and reflecting his early life.

Laurier's brick residence in Ottawa is known as Laurier House National Historic Site, at the corner of what is now Laurier Avenue and Chapel Street. In their will, the Lauriers left the house to Prime Minister Mackenzie King, who in turn donated it to Canada upon his death. Both sites are administered by Parks Canada as part of the national park system.

The 1876 Italianate residence of the Lauriers during his years as a lawyer and Member of Parliament, in Victoriaville, Quebec, is designated Wilfrid Laurier House National Historic Site, owned privately and operated as the Laurier Museum.

In November 2011, Wilfrid Laurier University located in Waterloo, Ontario, unveiled a statue depicting a young Wilfrid Laurier sitting on a bench, thinking.

Other honours

Laurier had titular honours including:
 the prenominal "The Honourable" and the postnominal "PC" for life by virtue of being made a member of the Queen's Privy Council for Canada on 8 October 1877.
 His prenominal was upgraded to "The Right Honourable" when he was made a member of the Imperial Privy Council of the United Kingdom in the 1897 Diamond Jubilee Honours
 the prenominal "Sir" and postnominal "GCMG" as a knight grand cross of the Order of Saint Michael and Saint George, bestowed in the 1897 Diamond Jubilee Honours
 The honorary degree LL.D. from the University of Edinburgh and the Freedom of the City of Edinburgh on 26 July 1902, when he visited the city while in the country for the coronation of King Edward VII.
 Sir Wilfrid Laurier Day is observed each year on 20 November, his birth date
 Laurier is depicted on several banknotes issued by the Bank of Canada:
The $1,000 note in the 1935 Series and 1937 Series
The $5 note in the Scenes of Canada series, 1972 and 1979, Birds of Canada series, 1986, Journey series, 2002 and Frontier series, 2013
 Laurier has appeared on at least three postage stamps, issued in 1927 (two) and 1973

Many sites and landmarks were named to honor Laurier. They include:
 Mount Sir Wilfrid Laurier, the highest peak in British Columbia's Premier Range, near Mount Robson
 Sir Wilfrid Laurier Elementary, located in Vancouver, British Columbia 
 Laurier Avenue, located in Milton, Ontario
 Avenue Laurier, located in Shawinigan, Quebec
 Laurier Boulevard, and Laurier Hill, located in Brockville, Ontario
 Avenue Laurier, located in Montreal, Quebec
 Boulevard Laurier, located in Quebec City, Quebec
 Laurier Avenue, located in Ottawa, Ontario
 Laurier Avenue, located in Deep River, Ontario
 Laurier Street, located in North Bay, Ontario
 Rue Laurier, located in Casselman, Ontario
 Rue Laurier Street, located in Rockland, Ontario
 The Laurier Heights neighbourhood, including Laurier Drive and Laurier Heights School, in Edmonton, Alberta
 Laurier Drive, located in Saskatoon's Confederation Park neighbourhood, where the majority of the streets are named after former Canadian prime ministers
 The provincial electoral district of Laurier-Dorion (an honour shared with Canadian politician Antoine-Aimé Dorion)
 The federal electoral district of Laurier—Sainte-Marie
 On 1 November 1973, Waterloo Lutheran University, one of Ontario's publicly funded universities, located in Waterloo, Ontario, was renamed Wilfrid Laurier University; the university has since added campuses in Brantford, Ontario and Milton, Ontario
 A Montreal Metro station, Laurier (Montreal Metro)
 CCGS Sir Wilfrid Laurier
 Château Laurier, a downtown Ottawa hotel of high reputation and a national historic site
 Sir Wilfrid Laurier Public School in Markham, Ontario
 Sir Wilfrid Laurier School Board, an English school board located in Quebec; the school board serves the Laval, Laurentides, and Lanaudière regions in Quebec
 Sir Wilfrid Laurier Secondary School in London, Ontario
 Sir Wilfrid Laurier Secondary School in Ottawa, Ontario
 Sir Wilfrid Laurier Collegiate Institute in Scarborough, Ontario

Supreme Court appointments
Wilfrid Laurier advised the Governor General to appoint the following individuals to the Supreme Court of Canada:
 Sir Louis Henry Davies (25 September 1901 – 1 May 1924)
 David Mills (8 February 1902 – 8 May 1903)
 Sir Henri Elzéar Taschereau (as Chief Justice 21 November 1902 – 2 May 1906; appointed a Puisne Justice under Prime Minister Mackenzie, 7 October 1878)
 John Douglas Armour (21 November 1902 – 11 July 1903)
 Wallace Nesbitt (16 May 1903 – 4 October 1905)
 Albert Clements Killam (8 August 1903 – 6 February 1905)
 John Idington (10 February 1905 – 31 March 1927)
 James Maclennan (5 October 1905 – 13 February 1909)
 Sir Charles Fitzpatrick (as Chief Justice, 4 June 1906 – 21 November 1918)
 Sir Lyman Poore Duff (27 September 1906 – 2 January 1944)
 Francis Alexander Anglin (23 February 1909 – 28 February 1933)
 Louis-Philippe Brodeur (11 August 1911 – 10 October 1923)

In popular culture
 Wilfrid Laurier appears as the leader of the Canadian civilization in the 4X video game Sid Meier's Civilization VI.

Electoral record

See also

 List of prime ministers of Canada
 8th Canadian Ministry
 1896 Canadian federal election
 1900 Canadian federal election
 1904 Canadian federal election
 1908 Canadian federal election
 1911 Canadian federal election
 List of Canadian federal general elections

References

Further reading

 Armstrong, Elizabeth H. The Crisis of Quebec, 1914–1918 (1937)
 Avery, Donald, and Peter Neary. "Laurier, Borden and a White British Columbia." Journal of Canadian Studies/Revue d'etudes canadiennes 12.4 (1977): 24.
 Bélanger, Réal. "Laurier, Sir Wilfrid," Dictionary of Canadian Biography vol. 14, University of Toronto/Université Laval, 2003–. Retrieved 6 November 2015, online
 Brown, Craig, and Ramsay Cook, Canada: 1896–1921 A Nation Transformed (1983), standard history
 Cook, Ramsay. "Dafoe, Laurier, and the Formation of Union Government." Canadian Historical Review 42#3 (1961) pp: 185–208.
 Dafoe, J. W. Laurier: A Study in Canadian Politics (1922) 
 Dutil, Patrice, and David MacKenzie, Canada, 1911: The Decisive Election that Shaped the Country (2011) 
 Granatstein, J.L. and Norman Hillmer, Prime Ministers: Ranking Canada's Leaders. pp. 46–60. (1999). .
 LaPierre, Laurier. Sir Wilfrid Laurier and the Romance of Canada – (1996). 
 Neatby, H. Blair. Laurier and a Liberal Quebec: A Study in Political Management (1973) 
 Neatby, H. Blair. "Laurier and imperialism." Report of the Annual Meeting. Vol. 34. No. 1. The Canadian Historical Association/La Société historique du Canada, 1955. online
 Robertson, Barbara. Wilfrid Laurier: The Great Conciliator (1971)
 Schull, Joseph. Laurier. The First Canadian (1965); biography
 Skelton, Oscar Douglas. Life and Letters of Sir Wilfrid Laurier 2v (1921); the standard biography v. 2 online free
 Skelton, Oscar Douglas. The Day of Sir Wilfrid Laurier A Chronicle of our own Times (1916), short popular survey online free
 Stewart, Gordon T. "Political Patronage under Macdonald and Laurier 1878–1911." American Review of Canadian Studies 10#1 (1980): 3–26.
 Stewart, Heather Grace. Sir Wilfrid Laurier: the weakling who stood his ground (2006) ; for children
 Waite, Peter Busby, Canada, 1874–1896: Arduous Destiny (1971), standard history

External links

 
 
 Wilfrid Laurier fonds at Library and Archives Canada. 
 Wilfrid Laurier on the platform; collection of the principal speeches made in Parliament or before the people, since his entry into active politics in 1871; by Wilfrid Laurier at archive.org
 Life and letters of Sir Wilfrid Laurier vol 1. at archive.org
 Life and letters of Sir Wilfrid Laurier vol 2. at archive.org
 Photograph: Wilfrid Laurier, 1890 – McCord Museum
 Photograph: Sir Wilfrid Laurier, c. 1900 – McCord Museum
 Photograph: Wilfrid Laurier, 1906 – McCord Museum
 
 The 8th Canadian Ministry - the Parliamentary website.

 
1841 births
1919 deaths
Canadian Roman Catholics
Canadian Knights Grand Cross of the Order of St Michael and St George
 
Leaders of the Liberal Party of Canada
Leaders of the Opposition (Canada)
Members of the House of Commons of Canada from Quebec
Members of the House of Commons of Canada from the Northwest Territories
Canadian members of the Privy Council of the United Kingdom
Quebec Liberal Party MNAs
Prime Ministers of Canada
Lawyers in Quebec
Quebec lieutenants
Persons of National Historic Significance (Canada)
French Quebecers
Canadian King's Counsel
McGill University Faculty of Law alumni
Burials at Notre-Dame Cemetery (Ottawa)